Miyu is a feminine Japanese given name.

Possible writings
Miyu can be written using different kanji characters and can mean:
美侑, "beauty, assist"
美結, "beauty, bind"
美夢, "beauty, dream"
美夕, "beauty, evening"
美唯, "beauty, only"
美由, "beauty, reason"
深優, "deep, tenderness"
実由, "fruit, reason"; "truth, reason"
実結, "fruit, bind"; "truth, bind"
心由, "heart, reason"
海由, "sea, reason"
未夢, "sheep, dream"
未由, "sheep, reason"
光由, "light, reason"
The name can also be written in hiragana or katakana .

People with the name
Miyu Irino (自由), Japanese voice actor
Miyu Kato (disambiguation), multiple people
, Japanese voice actress and idol
Miyu Matsuki (未祐), Japanese voice actress
, Japanese table tennis player
, Japanese volleyball player
Miyu Nagase (実夕), Japanese singer, guitarist and a former member of all-girls J-pop band ZONE
, Japanese swimmer
Miyu Uehara (美優), Japanese gravure idol
, Japanese singer
Miyu Tomita|富田 美憂 , ||born 1999 Japanese voice actress
, Japanese taekwondo practitioner
, Japanese professional wrestler in promotion Tokyo Jyoshi Pro Wrestling

Fictional characters
Miyu (美夕), main character in the anime series Vampire Princess Miyu
, a character in the manga series Fate/kaleid liner Prisma Illya
Miyu (ミユ), character from the game Star Fox 2
Miyu Greer (深優), character in the anime Mai-HiME
Miyu Myu mutant cat girl character in Alpha Kimori 2
Miyu, Dr. Sado's cat in Space Battleship Yamato
Miyu Kozuki, character in the anime series UFO Baby
Miyu Aida, character in the anime series Ro-Kyu-Bu!

See also
Miyū

Japanese feminine given names